Cuprella is a genus of flowering plants belonging to the family Brassicaceae.

Its native range is Northern Africa to Pakistan.

Species:

Cuprella antiatlantica 
Cuprella homalocarpa

References

Brassicaceae
Brassicaceae genera